The 1972 British National Track Championships were a series of track cycling competitions held during the summer of 1972.

Venues
Leicester Velodrome - (amateur sprint & pursuit, stayers, women's sprint) 
Middlesbrough, Cleveland and Redcar (time trial) 
Nottingham - (tandem) 
Wolverhampton - (pro sprint & pursuit)

Medal summary

Men's Events

Women's Events

References

National Track Championships